C. maritima may refer to:
 Cakile maritima, the European searocket, a common plant species
 Calendula maritima, the sea marigold, a very rare plant species
 Calidris maritima, the purple sandpiper, a small shorebird species
 Cicindela maritima, a ground beetle species native to Europe
 Coreopsis maritima, the sea dahlia or beach coreopsis, a plant species
 Crambe maritima, the sea kale, a halophytic perennial plant that grows wild along the coasts of Europe

Synonyms
 Canavalia maritima, a synonym for Canavalia rosea, the beach bean, bay bean, seaside bean, coastal jackbean or MacKenzie bean
 Cattleya maritima, a synonym for Cattleya intermedia
 Cineraria maritima, a synonym for Jacobaea maritima, also commonly known as Senecio cineraria, a plant species
 Clypeola maritima, a synonym for Lobularia maritima, a plant species

See also
 Maritima (disambiguation)